Hypena munitalis is a moth of the family Erebidae first described by Josef Johann Mann in 1861. It is found in Turkey, the Balkans and the Armenian-Caucasian region. In the Levant it has been recorded from Lebanon and Israel.

Adults are on wing in July in Israel. There are two generations per year.

The larvae feed on Stellaria and Vincetoxicum species.

References

"The Acronictinae, Bryophilinae, Hypenodinae and Hypeninae of Israel"

munitalis
Moths of Europe
Moths of Asia
Moths of the Middle East
Moths described in 1861